Co-op Village is a populated place situated in Maricopa County, Arizona, United States. It is located in the Gila River Indian Community.

References

Populated places in Maricopa County, Arizona
Gila River Indian Community